Worth Township, Illinois may refer to the following places:

Worth Township, Cook County, Illinois
Worth Township, Woodford County, Illinois

See also

Worth Township (disambiguation)

Illinois township disambiguation pages